Le Malzieu may refer to one of the following places:

 Le Malzieu-Ville, a commune in Lozère, France
 Le Malzieu-Forain, a commune in Lozère, France

See also
Malzieu, a French surname
Saint-Léger-du-Malzieu